Clan Gartshore  is an armigerous lowland Scottish Clan from Dumbartonshire.

The name comes from lands of that name in the parish of Kirkintilloch in Dumbartonshire. There are references to the Gartshore Clan as far back as the late 12th century. Thomas Watson describes the earliest emergence of the clan in his 1894 book on Kirkintilloch.

References

External links 
Gartshore Family History website

Gartshore